Roberto Biancu (born 19 January 2000) is an Italian football player who plays as midfielder for  club Olbia.

Club career

Cagliari 
On 30 November 2016, at 16, Biancu made his professional debut for Cagliari as a substitute replacing Illia Briukhov in the 77th minute of a 3–0 away defeat against Sampdoria in the fourth round of Coppa Italia. On 28 March 2017 he made his Serie A debut as a substitute replacing Alessandro Deiola in the 80th minute of a 2–1 home win over Milan.

Olbia 
On 16 August 2017, Biancu was signed by Serie C side Olbia on a season-long loan deal. On 15 October he made his Serie C debut for Olbia as a substitute replacing Alessio Murgia in the 83rd minute of a 1–0 away win over Arezzo. On 22 October he played his first entire match for Olbia, a 4–1 home win over Cuneo. On 7 April 2018, Biancu scored his first professional goal in the 90th minute of a 4–2 home win over Livorno. On 10 April he scored his second goal in the 17th minute of a 3–2 home defeat against Arezzo. Biancu ended his season-long loan to Olbia with 23 appearances, 2 goals and 3 assists.

On 17 July 2018, after extended his contract until 2023, his loan to Olbia was extended for another season. On 19 September he played his first match of his second season at Olbia, a 3–2 away win over Albissola, he was replaced after 86 minutes by Antonio Martiniello. On 16 December he played his first entire match of the season, a 4–0 away defeat against Novara. On 17 February 2019, Bianco scored his first goal of the season in the 48th minute of a 3–1 home win over Carrarese. Biancu ended his second season on loan at Olbia with 31 appearances, 1 goal and 1 assist.

On 8 August 2019, Biancu returned for the third season on loan at Olbia. On 25 August, Biancu played his first match of the new season, a 2–1 away win over Robur Siena, he played the entire match. Two weeks later, on 8 September, he scored his first goal of the season in the 11th minute of a 3–2 away defeat against Pontedera. On 26 September he scored his second goal in the 54th minute of a 4–2 away defeat against Carrarese.

On 28 August 2020, the loan was renewed for yet another season.

On 18 August 2021, the loan was renewed once again for the 2021–22 season.

On 3 July 2022, Biancu moved to Olbia on a permanent basis with a contract until June 2025.

International career 
Biancu represented Italy at Under-16, Under-17 and Under-18 levels. On 9 March 2016 he made his debut at U-16 level as a 55th-minute substitute replacing Fabrizio Caligara in a 1–0 away win over Netherlands U-16, two months later he scored his first goal at this level in the 66th minute of a 3–0 away win over Croatia U-16. On 24 August 2016, Biancu made his debut at U-17 level in a 2–0 home win over Bosnia and Herzegovina U-17, he was replaced by Giuseppe Iglio after 72 minutes. On 31 October 2016 he scored his first goal at U-17 level in a 2–0 win over Serbia U-17. Biancu played 5 matches in the 2017 UEFA European Under-17 Championship qualification, he was also in the team who played the 2017 UEFA European Under-17 Championship, however Italy U-17 was eliminated at group stage. On 9 September 2017 he made his debut at Under-18 level in a 3–3 away draw against Slovenia U-18.

Career statistics

Club

References

2000 births
Living people
People from Sassari
Footballers from Sardinia
Italian footballers
Association football midfielders
Serie A players
Serie C players
Cagliari Calcio players
Olbia Calcio 1905 players
Italy youth international footballers
Competitors at the 2018 Mediterranean Games
Mediterranean Games silver medalists for Italy
Mediterranean Games medalists in football